The Museum of Almería is an archaeological museum in the Province of Almería. It has been a public institution since 1934, and moved to a new building in 2006.

History 
In 1880, the Belgian engineer Luis Siret found Los Millares, a prehistoric site in the region of Almería. During his archaeological research there, he developed a collection of artifacts which he eventually donated to the National Archeological Museum, with the desire that part of the collection stay in Almería. The conditions were agreed upon during the Second Spanish Republic, when the museum was opened. There were two small rooms which were handed over by the “Escuela de Artes y Oficios” in 1934 but this collection didn’t have the pieces that Louis Siret had hoped would remain in Almería. In 2006, the museum was moved to its current building.

Current museum 
The new museum has three floors used for exhibitions. A  display of a stratigraphic column spans all three floors, rising to the roof of the building. The exhibitions are mainly dedicated to Copper and Bronze Age history.

Collections

Permanent exhibition 
The permanent exhibition is located on the first and second floors of the building. The focus is mainly on:
 hunter-gatherer society, 
 the society of Los Millares (Santa Fe de Mondújar, Almería) 
 the society of the “El Argar” culture centred on Antas, Almería.

On the second floor, there is a metal structure in the middle of the room called the “Circle of Life.” Materials that teach us about the trade and war of the Millares society surround it. There are also objects related to the daily life of the settlement. The “Circle of Death” display, with the support of a video projection, shadows and sound, demonstrates much about the collective use of the graves and the ritual sequence carried out with each new burial.
On the second floor is a layout of consecutive walls progressing from the bottom to the top, with the intention of showing how the society lived on the hillsides through their terraced homes and landscapes, especially in Fuente-Álamo, Cuevas del Almanzora, Almería. The area includes small sub-rooms with glass cases containing big vessels, bronze weapons, silver and gold objects and ceramics among other remains.

Semi-permanent exhibition 
On the third floor, there is a long term display of a collection of Roman and Andalusian pieces. This includes a sculpture of the god Bacchus, found in a Roman villa excavated in the town of Chirivel in the northern part of Almería. There is also a collection of Andalusian Muslim tombstones, of which Almería was the leading production center. A display in the center of the room holds cabinets containing ceramics, toys, coins, and other small objects.

More in the museum 
The museum also holds a library which is open to the public. 
The museum holds an exhibition area on the main floor where painting, contemporary art, and photography are displayed. 
There is a large space at the front of the museum which can be used by the general public.

Building 

In 2006, the museum moved to a new building designed by Ignacio García Pedrosa and Ángela García de Paredes. The building won two awards (PAD and ARCO) in 2004. It was also a finalist in 2005 in the Fostering Arts and Design (FAD) Awards. In 2008, it received an honorable mention by the European Museum of the Year contest.

Gallery

References

External links 

 
 Digital Collections Network of Museums of Spain. Advanced Search
 The museum brochure
 Brochure and game the Museum of Almería for children
 Architecture of state museums. Spain
 Pictures and technical details Almería Museum. GPD Project
 Spain is culture. Museum of Almería
 Official Guide museums of Andalusia. 2010

Museums in Andalusia
Museums established in 2006
Archaeological museums in Spain
Buildings and structures in Almería